New Monterey is a former unincorporated community incorporated in Monterey in Monterey County, California. It is located north of the Presidio of Monterey, at an elevation of 56 feet (17 m). Monterey's famous Cannery Row is located in New Monterey neighborhood.

The New Monterey post office operated from 1909 to 1913.

Government
Because New Monterey falls within the Monterey city limits, it is governed by Monterey's mayor and 4 city council members, all elected by the public. As of December 2019, the mayor is Clyde Roberson and the city council members are Dan Albert, Jr., Alan Haffa, Ed Smith, and Tyller Williamson. 

At the county level, Monterey is represented on the Monterey County Board of Supervisors by Supervisor Mary Adams.

See also

 Bistro Moulin
 Cannery Row
 Monterey Bay Aquarium

References

Neighborhoods in Monterey, California